The 1980–81 English League North season was the third season of the English League North (also known as the Midland League), the top level ice hockey league in northern England. Seven teams participated in the league, and the Blackpool Seagulls won the championship and qualified for the semifinals of the British Championship as a result.

Regular season

External links
 Season on hockeyarchives.info

English
English League North seasons